The following page lists major metallurgical companies in Ukraine. They contribute to Ukraine's metallurgical industry.

Ore mining and enrichment
 Ingulets Iron Ore Enrichment Works
 Northern Iron Ore Dressing Works
 Southern Iron Ore Dressing Works
 Central Iron Ore Enrichment Works
 Eastern Ore Dressing Works
 Evraz Sukha Balka
 Kryvorizky Iron Ore (Kryvbasruda)
 Pokrovsk Ore Dressing Works (Ordzhonikidze Ore Dressing)
 Marhanets Ore Dressing Works
 Zaporizky Iron Ore
 Irshansk Mine
 Poltava Mine
 Eristovo Mine
 Belanovo Mine
 Kamysh-Burun Mine
 Novokryvorizky Iron Ore

Steel and cast iron production
 Azovstal iron and steel works
 Illich Steel and Iron Works
 Donetsk Iron and Steel Works
 Donetsk Steel-Rolling Works
 Kramatorsk Iron and Steel Works
 Makiivka Iron and Steel Works
 Yenakiyeve Iron and Steel Works
 Kostiantynivka Iron and Steel Works
 Energomashspetsstal
 Alchevsk Iron and Steel Works
 ArcelorMittal Kryvyi Rih (Kryvorizhstal)
 Dnieper Iron and Steel Works
 Dnipro Iron and Steel Works
 Interpipe Steel (Dniprostal)
 Stalzavod (Dniprodzerzhynsk Steel Plant)
 Zaporizhstal
 Zaporizhzhia Foundry and Mechanical Plant
 Kerch Iron and Steel Works
 Kremenchuk Steel Works

Hardware and wire rope production
 Druzhkivka Hardware
 Dnipro Hardware
 Nikopol Factory of Technological Equipment
 Silur, a wire rope factory
 Kremenchuk Hardware

Pipe production
 Khartsyzk pipe plant
 Dnieper Factory of Stainless Pipes
 IVIS Steel Factory of Arc Welding Pipes
 Nyznyodniprovsky Pipe Factory
 Dnipropetrovsky Pipe Factory
 Novomoskovsky Pipe Factory
 Interpipe Niko Tube
 Nikopol Steel Pipe Plant Utist
 Nikopol Pipe Company
 Oscar Tube
 Trubostal
 Centravis
 Luhansk Pipe Factory
 Rubizhne Pipe Factory

Non-ferrous and special alloy metallurgy
 Artemivsk Factory of non-Ferrous Metals
 Mykytivsky Mercury Factory
 Ukrtsynk
 Toreztverdosplav
 Dokuchaevsk Dolomite-Sintering Factory
 Bilokamiansky Refractory
 Nikopol Ferroalloy Plant
 Zaporizhzhia Ferroalloy Plant
 Zaporizhzhia Aluminum
 Zaporizhzhya Titanium-Magnesium Plant
 Vilnohirsk non-Ferrous Metallurgy
 Ukrainian Chemical Products
 Ukrgrafit
 Stakhanov Ferroalloy Plant
 Severodonetsk Chemical-Metallurgy Factory
 Dneprospetsstal
 Pobuzke Ferronickel
 Nuclear Fuel Factory
 Kramatorsk Ferroalloy Plant
 Prydniprovsky Factory of non-Ferrous Metals
 Ukrsplav
 Brovary powder metallurgy
 Kremenchuk powder metallurgy
 Poltava powder metallurgy

Investment and holdings companies
 Nuclear Fuel (Ukraine)
 Metinvest
 Interpipe
 Ferrexpo
 Evraz
 IVIS Steel
 ArcelorMittal

Former
 Nikopol Southern Pipe Factory
 Zaporizhzhia Steel-Rolling Mill
 Luhansk Cast Iron Mill
 Kupiansk Cast Iron Mill

See also 
 Metal production in Ukraine

References 

Metallurgy companies